Richard John McMoran Wilson, 2nd Baron Moran, 
 (22 September 1924 – 14 February 2014), known as John Wilson, was a British diplomat. He was one of the ninety hereditary peers elected to remain in the House of Lords after the passing of the House of Lords Act 1999.

Background and early life
The son of the 1st Baron Moran and Dorothy (née Dufton), he was educated at Eton College in Berkshire and King's College, Cambridge, where he received a Bachelor of Arts in history. Wilson served in the Royal Naval Reserve from 1943 to 1945. He was first Ordinary Seaman on HMS Belfast, later Sub-Lieutenant on Motor Torpedo Boats (MTB 684) and Destroyer HMS Oribi.

Diplomatic career
In 1945, Wilson entered the Foreign and Commonwealth Office and held various minor offices in Ankara, Tel Aviv, Rio de Janeiro, Washington, D.C. and South Africa. From 1968 to 1973, he was Head of the West African Department of the Foreign Office, and from 1970 to 1973 concurrently non-resident British Ambassador to Chad. Wilson was British Ambassador to Hungary between 1973 and 1976 and British Ambassador to Portugal from 1976 to 1981.

In 1981, he was appointed High Commissioner to Canada and held this post until 1984. On leaving his post of High Commissioner to Canada in 1984, Moran penned a frank final telegram to the British Foreign Secretary in which he was critical of Canadian politicians and public policies. The telegram became public in October 2009 after a BBC columnist, Matthew Parris, made a freedom of information request for the foreign office's valedictory despatches.

Other public appointments
From 1990 to 1995, Wilson was chair of the Wildlife and Countryside Link, from 1988 to 1995 vice-chairman of the Atlantic Salmon Trust, and from 1989 to 1994 served as chairman of the National Rivers Authority Regional Fisheries Advisory Committee for the Welsh Region. For RSPB, he was council member from 1992 to 1994, and vice-president from 1996 to 1997. He was president of the Radnorshire Wildlife Trust (1994-death) and Chair of the Fisheries Policy and Legislation Working Group ("the Moran Committee"; from 1997 until his death). In 1997 he was appointed chair of the Salmon and Trout Association, remaining until 2000, when he became executive vice-president. Having been president of the Welsh Salmon and Trout Angling Association from 1988 to 1995, he was renamed as president in 2000.

Writings
In 1973, Wilson wrote a biography about Sir Henry Campbell-Bannerman, for which he received the Whitbread Award for Biography. Having been made a Companion of the Order of St Michael and St George in 1970, he was raised to a Knight Commander in 1981. In 1978, he received also the Grand Cross of the Portuguese Order of Infante D. Henrique.

Family
In 1948 he married Shirley Rowntree Harris; the couple had two sons and a daughter. He died in February 2014 aged 89.

Works
C.B. – A Life of Sir Henry Campbell-Bannerman (1973)

References

1924 births
2014 deaths
Barons in the Peerage of the United Kingdom
High Commissioners of the United Kingdom to Canada
Royal Navy officers
Knights Commander of the Order of St Michael and St George
People educated at Eton College
Alumni of King's College, Cambridge
Diplomatic peers
Royal Naval Volunteer Reserve personnel of World War II
Ambassadors of the United Kingdom to Chad
Ambassadors of the United Kingdom to Hungary
Ambassadors of the United Kingdom to Portugal
Costa Book Award winners
Royal Naval Reserve personnel
Hereditary peers elected under the House of Lords Act 1999